New England English is, collectively, the various distinct dialects and varieties of American English originating in the New England area. Most of eastern and central New England once spoke the "Yankee dialect", some of whose accent features still remain in Eastern New England today, such as "R-dropping" (though this feature is now receding among younger speakers). Accordingly, one linguistic division of New England is into Eastern versus Western New England English, as defined in the 1939 Linguistic Atlas of New England and the 2006 Atlas of North American English (ANAE). The ANAE further argues for a division between Northern versus Southern New England English, especially on the basis of the cot–caught merger and  fronting (applying twice, for example, in the phrase Park the car). The ANAE also categorizes the strongest differentiated New England accents into four combinations of the above dichotomies, simply defined as follows:

 Northeastern New England English shows non-rhoticity, the cot–caught merger, and strong  fronting. It centers on Boston, Massachusetts, extending into New Hampshire and coastal Maine.
 Southeastern New England English shows non-rhoticity, no cot–caught merger, and no strong  fronting. It centers on Providence, Rhode Island and the Narragansett Bay.
 Northwestern New England English shows rhoticity, the cot–caught merger, and strong  fronting. It centers on Vermont.
 Southwestern New England English shows rhoticity, no (or a transitional state of the) cot–caught merger, and no strong  fronting. It centers around the Hartford–Springfield area of Connecticut and western Massachusetts.

Overview

Phonology

Distinctions
Regarding the former feature, all of northern New England (most famously including Boston, but going as far southeast as Cape Cod and as far north as central Maine) historically merges the open and open-mid back rounded vowels (so that, for instance, pond and pawned are pronounced the same, which is commonly called the cot–caught merger), while southern coastal New England (including Rhode Island) historically maintains a noticeable distinction between these two vowels. Regarding the second feature, all of Eastern New England is historically non-rhotic (famously pronouncing "car" like "kah"), while all of Western New England is historically rhotic (or "r-ful"). Therefore, four combinations of these two features are possible, and coincidentally all four exist among New England English speakers, largely correlated with the exact geographic quadrant in New England in which a speaker was raised.

Commonalities
All of New England raises the tongue in the first element of the diphthong  before voiceless consonants, so writer has a raised vowel, with this often being its only distinguishing feature versus rider. Eastern New England, specifically, also raises the first element of  before voiceless consonants (commonly known as Canadian raising).

While this form of t-glottalization (especially the  form) is found throughout the country, a realization with a full schwa vowel  is also a variant sometimes observed particularly among New Englanders, with reportings for instance in New Hampshire, Vermont, Connecticut, and Massachusetts. It may, however, be a younger pronunciation variant nationwide (also reported in places as diverse as Utah, California, and New Jersey).

In all of New England except Rhode Island, the short a  may also be somewhat raised in many other environments, similar to the Great Lakes region.

The lack of the weak vowel merger is a well-known traditional feature of New England Englishes. This makes Lenin  distinct from Lennon , whereas rabbit  is no longer a perfect rhyme of abbott . This feature is shared with Southern American English as well as the British Received Pronunciation.

Vocabulary
The following terms originate from and are used commonly and nearly exclusively throughout New England: 
 for sub, a long, large sandwich (with Italian sandwich specific to Maine English) 
 as a largely older term for hamburger or hamburger meat
 for garage sale or yard sale (predominant in Southwestern New England English) 
 for traffic circle or roundabout 
 is used as an intensifier word, common before adjectives or adverbs (predominant in Northern and Eastern New England English, famously Boston).
As in the rest of the Northeast, sneakers is the primary term for athletic shoes, tractor trailer for semi-trailer truck, cellar for basement, brook is common for stream, and soda is any sweet and bubbly non-alcoholic drink. Many Boston-originating local terms have dispersed throughout Eastern New England and, prominently, all the rest of Massachusetts.

Eastern New England English

Eastern New England English encompasses Boston and Maine accents, and, according to some definitions, the distinct Rhode Island accent. All Eastern New England English is famous for non-rhoticity, meaning it drops the r sound everywhere except before a vowel: thus, in words like car, card, fear, and chowder. The phrase Park the car in Harvard Yard—dialectally transcribed —is commonly used as a shibboleth, or speech indicator, for the non-rhotic Eastern New England dialect running from Boston north to Maine, and as far west as Worcester, which contrasts with the rhotic dialects in the vast majority of North America. In all of Eastern New England, except Rhode Island, words like caught and cot are pronounced identically (both are often rounded,), because those two vowel sounds have fully merged. A phenomenon called Canadian raising occurs throughout Eastern New England, causing writer to have a different stressed vowel sound than rider, and for the verb house to have a different vowel sound than the noun house.  and  have relatively back starting positions. The horse–hoarse distinction is still present to some extent in some areas, as well as the Mary–marry–merry distinction in many speakers.

Western New England English

Western New England English encompasses the accents of Vermont, western Massachusetts, and Connecticut. These accents are fully rhotic, meaning all r sounds are pronounced, as in most of North America. Here,  and  have slightly fronted starting positions, and the Mary–marry–merry merger and horse–hoarse merger are fully complete. Western New England English exhibits the entire continuum of possibilities regarding the cot–caught merger: a full merger is heard in its northern reaches (namely, Vermont) and a full distinction at its southern reaches (namely, coastal Connecticut), and a transitional area in the middle. Western New England English is closely related to and influential on, but more conservative (i.e. preserving more historical features) than, the Inland North dialect which prevails farther west, and which has altered away from Western New England English due to an entirely new chain shift of the vowels since the 1900s. Some Western New England English speakers do have these shift's features, though it is not yet fully understood if and how New England directly influenced the Inland North dialect region.

See also
 Boston accent
 Maine accent
 New England French
 North American English regional phonology § New England
 Regional accents of English speakers
 Regional vocabularies of American English

References

Bibliography

Further reading

 Stanford, James. 2019. New England English: Large-scale acoustic sociophonetics and dialectology. Oxford University Press. 367 pages.

External links

 
 

American English
Connecticut culture
English
Maine culture
Languages of Massachusetts
New Hampshire culture
Rhode Island culture
Vermont culture